Ramdeo Yadav is an Indian politician in the Rashtriya Janata Dal. He was elected as a member of the Bihar Legislative Assembly from Belhar on 24 October 2019.

References

Living people
Members of the Bihar Legislative Assembly
Rashtriya Janata Dal politicians
Year of birth missing (living people)